Benkner is a German surname. Notable people with the surname include:

 Charlotte Benkner (1889–2004), American supercentenarian
 Otto Benkner (1909–1996), German chess master

See also
Benner (surname)

German-language surnames